Ronald Frederick John "Jack" Percival (19 April 1924 - 6 October 2011) was a professional footballer, who played for Huddersfield Town, Chesterfield and Cambridge United. He was born in Norwood Green, Ealing, Greater London and started his career in 1947 playing for Tunbridge Wells in the Kent Amateur League before signing for Huddersfield in February 1948.

References

External links
Official Website - 

1924 births
2011 deaths
English footballers
Footballers from Ealing
Association football defenders
English Football League players
Tunbridge Wells F.C. players
Huddersfield Town A.F.C. players
Chesterfield F.C. players
Cambridge United F.C. players